Matt Murphy (born 20 August 1971) is a footballer who played 270 games in the Football League. In February 2009 he was appointed player/assistant manager of United Counties League club Daventry United.

Club career
Murphy started his career in non-league football with Long Buckby, Cogenhoe United, Irthlingborough Diamonds and Corby Town, before joining Oxford United for a fee of £20,000. He played nearly 250 league games for Oxford, and spent time with Scunthorpe United, Bury and Swansea City before returning to non-league. He has since played for Kettering Town, King's Lynn, Ford Sports, Slough Town, Brackley Town, Banbury United, Spalding United, Wellingborough Town, Sileby, and Daventry United.

References

External links

1971 births
Living people
Footballers from Northampton
English footballers
Long Buckby A.F.C. players
Cogenhoe United F.C. players
Irthlingborough Diamonds F.C. players
Corby Town F.C. players
Oxford United F.C. players
Scunthorpe United F.C. players
Bury F.C. players
Swansea City A.F.C. players
Kettering Town F.C. players
King's Lynn F.C. players
Daventry United F.C. players
Slough Town F.C. players
Brackley Town F.C. players
Banbury United F.C. players
Spalding United F.C. players
Wellingborough Town F.C. players
Northampton Sileby Rangers F.C. players
English Football League players
Southern Football League players
Association football forwards
Association football midfielders